The Central District of Juybar County is a district (bakhsh) in Juybar County, Mazandaran Province, Iran. At the 2006 census, its population was 49,329, in 12,914 families.  The District has one city: Juybar. The District has two rural districts (dehestan): Hasan Reza Rural District and Siyahrud Rural District.

References 

Juybar County
Districts of Mazandaran Province